The grey threadfin sea-bass (Cratinus agassizii) is a species of marine ray finned fish which is a member of the subfamily Serraninae of the family Serranidae, which also includes the groupers and anthias. It is found in the eastern Pacific Ocean off Ecuador and northern Peru and in the Galapagos Islands.

References

Serraninae
Fish described in 1878
Taxa named by Franz Steindachner